The Münchner Verkehrsgesellschaft (MVG; Munich Transport Company) is a municipally owned company responsible for operating public transport in Munich, Germany. It operates buses, the Munich tramway and the Munich U-Bahn.

The company is a subsidiary of Stadtwerke München (Munich City Utilities), and a member of the Münchner Verkehrs- und Tarifverbund (MVV; Munich Transport and Tariff Association).

MVG Museum

The MVG maintains a museum, located at Ständlerstraße 20 near the terminus of tram line 18. The museum contains a collection of some 25 historic trams, buses and utility vehicles from different eras. It opens to the public on alternate Sundays.

References

External links

MVG web site (German language)
MVG web site (English language subset)
MVG Museum web site (German language)
Tram Travels: Münchner Verkehrsgesellschaft (MVG)

Railway companies of Germany
Transport in Munich
Companies based in Munich